Savar-e Pain (also Romanized as Savār-e Pā’īn) is a village in Zavkuh Rural District, Pishkamar District, Kalaleh County, Golestan Province, Iran. At the 2006 census, its population was 493, with 106 families.

References 

Populated places in Kalaleh County